Hell houses are haunted attractions typically run by evangelical Protestant churches or parachurch organizations, designed to act as moral instruction.  They depict acts which the organizers deem  sinful and their consequences, including the torments of the damned in Hell, and usually conclude with a depiction of Heaven.  Scenes portrayed may include date rape, same-sex marriage, gambling, interracial marriage, abortion, extramarital sex, raving, the use of alcoholic beverages and drugs, and teen suicide.  Other hell houses focus on the theme of the seven deadly sins. Hell houses typically emphasize the belief that those who do not repent of their sins and choose to follow Christ are condemned to Hell.

A Hell house, like a conventional haunted-house attraction, is a space set aside for actors to frighten patrons with gruesome exhibits and scenes, presented as a series of short vignettes with a narrated guide. Unlike haunted houses, Hell houses focus on real-life situations and the effects of sin or the fate of unrepentant sinners in the afterlife. They are most typically operated in the days preceding Halloween.

History
The idea was first popularized by Jerry Falwell in the late 1970s.  The first known hell house was set up in Lynchburg, Virginia, beginning production in 1972, and was called the "ScareMare".  Similar events began in several regions during that period.

Trinity Assembly of God, in Cedar Hill, Texas, is known to have presented a hell house since 1990.

From 1995 the concept was promoted and adapted by Keenan Roberts, originally of Roswell, New Mexico, who started a Hell house in Arvada, Colorado. Since that time, Hell houses have become a regular fixture of the Halloween season in parts of the United States. Roberts remained active in the Hell house ministry by providing kits and directions to enable churches to perform their own attractions.  As of 16 January 2017 the "Hell House Kit" was still available.  As of 2023, a package of hell house scripts and scenes was being sold for $479.

In October 2000, documentary filmmaker George Ratliff filmed a production of a Hell house in Cedar Hill, Texas from scripting to the final night of the production.  The resulting documentary, Hell House, has inspired numerous live plays and hell-house performances, including one based on Pastor Roberts' production, which played for a month during the 2006 Halloween season in an off-Broadway production in Brooklyn, New York by Les Freres Corbusier.

References

Further reading
 Nixon, Elisabeth Ann (2006) Playing Devil's Advocate on the Path to Heaven: Evangelical Hell Houses and the Play of Politics, Fear and Faith (PhD dissertation).

External links
 Judgement House

Christian fundamentalism
Halloween in the United States
Articles containing video clips